Jones Bluffs  are high, mainly snow-covered bluffs rising south of Holt Glacier in the eastern part of Bear Peninsula, Walgreen Coast, Marie Byrd Land. They were first mapped by the United States Geological Survey from air photos obtained by U.S. Navy Operation Highjump in January 1947, and were named by the Advisory Committee on Antarctic Names after Lieutenant Commander S.W. Jones, U.S. Navy, who piloted aircraft for magnetometry studies during Operation Deep Freeze 1966 and 1967. Later, in 1977, a prominent projection of the bluffs was named Barnes Bluff, after another Operation Deep Freeze officer.

See also
Wright Pass

References

Cliffs of Marie Byrd Land